South Tipperary was a county in Ireland. It was part of the South-East Region and was also located in the province of Munster. It was named after the town of Tipperary and consisted of 52% of the land area of the traditional county of Tipperary. South Tipperary County Council was the local authority for the county. The population of the county was 88,433 according to the 2011 census.  It was abolished on 3 June 2014, merged with North Tipperary under a new Tipperary County Council.

Geography and political subdivisions 

The county was part of the central plain of Ireland, but the diversified terrain contained several mountain ranges, notably the Knockmealdowns and the Galtees. The county was landlocked and drained by the River Suir. The centre of the county included much of the Golden Vale, a rich pastoral stretch of land in the Suir basin which extends into counties Limerick and Cork.

The county was established in 1898 with separate assize courts since 1838. The county town was Clonmel; other important urban centres included Carrick-on-Suir, Cashel, Cahir and Tipperary. The county's motto was Vallis Aurea Siurensis.

Baronies
There were six historic baronies in South Tipperary: Clanwilliam, Iffa and Offa East, Iffa and Offa West, Kilnamanagh Lower, Middle Third and Slievardagh.

Civil parishes and townlands

Civil parishes in Ireland were delineated after the Down Survey as an intermediate subdivision, with multiple townlands per parish and multiple parishes per barony. The civil parishes had some use in local taxation and were included on the nineteenth century maps of the Ordnance Survey of Ireland. For poor law purposes, district electoral divisions replaced civil parishes in the mid-nineteenth century. There were 123 civil parishes in the county.

Local government and politics 
The administrative county of Tipperary (South Riding) was established in 1898. The area also had a separate existence as a judicial county following the establishment of assize courts in 1838. The county's name changed to South Tipperary, and the council's name to South Tipperary County Council under the Local Government Act 2001. The Council oversaw the county as an independent local government area. The council was made up of 21 representatives, directly elected through the system of proportional representation by means of a single transferable vote. 

Under the provisions of the Local Government Act 1991, (Regional Authorities) (Establishment) Order, 1993, the territory of South Tipperary was defined as being in the South-East Region. This region was a NUTS III region of the European Union. The county of North Tipperary, by contrast, was part of the Mid-West Region. At a NUTS II level, both counties were in the Southern and Eastern region.

Irish language
There were native speakers of Irish in South Tipperary until the middle of the 20th century. Recordings of their dialect, made before the last native speakers died, have been made available through a project of the Royal Irish Academy Library.

References

 
 
Munster
2014 disestablishments in Ireland
Former counties of Ireland